Alexander Roediger (or Rödiger) (tr. ; , in Veliky Novgorod, Novgorod Governorate, Russian Empire – 26 January 1920, in Sevastopol, Crimean ASSR, Russian SFSR) was a Russo-German General of Infantry who fought in the Russo-Turkish War of 1877-78, served as a member of the Imperial Russian State Council, and was the Minister of War of the Russian Empire (1905–1909). He also briefly served as the Minister of War of the Principality of Bulgaria (1883).

Biography

Origin
His family was of Hessian origin.

Career
Roediger graduate of the Page Corps and a student of the Nikolayev Academy of the General Staff; served in the Russo-Turkish War of 1877-1878; in 1882 was appointed Assistant Minister and later Minister of War of the newly independent Principality of Bulgaria; on his return to Russia became a Professor in the Nikolayev Military Academy. He was appointed Assistant Minister of War of Russia in 1898 under Aleksey Kuropatkin. Served as Russian Minister of War from 1905 through 1909 serving in the Witte, Goremykin and Stolypin governments. He was also an appointed member of the Imperial State Council beginning in 1905. In June 1907 police foiled a plot to assassinate Roediger. Several members of Socialist-Revolutionary Party were arrested.

References
 Out of My Past: Memoirs of Count Kokovtsov; Hoover War Library Publications Number 6, Stanford University Press, 1935.
 NEW RUSSIAN WAR MINISTER.; Gen. Ridiger Is Appointed to Succeed Gen. Sakharoff.
 PLOT TO KILL RUDIGER.; Police Discover Conspiracy to Murder Russian War Minister.

1854 births
1920 deaths
People from Veliky Novgorod
People from Novgorodsky Uyezd
Members of the State Council (Russian Empire)
Russian generals
Russian memoirists
Defence ministers of Bulgaria